The 1957 Toledo Rockets football team was an American football team that represented Toledo University in the Mid-American Conference (MAC) during the 1957 NCAA University Division football season. In their first season under head coach Harry Larche, the Rockets compiled a 5–4 record (3–2 against MAC opponents), finished in fourth place in the MAC, and were outscored by their opponents by a combined total of 147 to 136.

The team's statistical leaders included Sam Tisci with 760 passing yards, Norm Billingslea with 565 rushing yards, and Gene Cook with 495 receiving yards.

Schedule

References

Toledo
Toledo Rockets football seasons
Toledo Rockets football